Sanctuary San Camillo de Lellis  is a church in Milan, Italy.

Roman Catholic churches in Milan